Stuart Edward Blackler was Dean of Hobart from 1993 to 2005.

He was educated at the University of Melbourne; and ordained in 1967.   He began his career with  curacies in Melbourne, South Yarra and Geelong. After an incumbency at Nunawading, Victoria he became a teacher at Melbourne Grammar School.

References

University of Melbourne alumni
Deans of Hobart
Living people
Year of birth missing (living people)
Australian schoolteachers
Melbourne Grammar School
20th-century Australian Anglican priests
21st-century Australian Anglican priests